Kapamilya Box Office (KBO) was a Philippine pay-per-view television channel. It was initially launched in May 2015 as a pay-per-view channel intended for the historic boxing match between Manny Pacquiao and Floyd Mayweather Jr. It was formerly registered as the "TVplus Xtra Channel" but became inactive after the coverage. By April 2016, the channel was rebranded as KBO.

Kapamilya Box Office permanently ceased broadcasting on June 30, 2020, due to the alias cease-and-desist order (ACDO) issued by the National Telecommunications Commission (NTC) and Solicitor General Jose Calida against ABS-CBN TV Plus because of the expired franchise. However, the operations continued through Sky Cable via SKY PPV (Sky Pay-Per-View) and The Filipino Channel various platforms.

About
KBO's weekend programming includes a movie marathon from the film libraries of Star Cinema, Viva Films, Regal Films, independent film outfits and various Hollywood film studios, and Myx simulcast (also on Channel 12 as a free trial). PPV events are also included to its programming schedule (such as boxing matches and certain events).

Quo warranto petition

On February 10, 2020, Solicitor General Jose Calida filed a quo warranto petition against ABS-CBN Corporation and its subsidiary ABS-CBN Convergence to the Supreme Court of the Philippines for violating their legislative franchise conditions, including the operations of KBO. ABS-CBN would later clarify the statement on Calida's claim that all of their broadcast operations, including KBO, had received government and regulatory approvals. On February 24, 2020, NTC Commissioner Gamaliel Cordoba stated that ABS-CBN would pay a fine of ₱200 for operating the said pay-per-view channel without any guidelines yet from the NTC.

On June 23, 2020, the Supreme Court of the Philippines dismissed the quo warranto petition to revoke ABS-CBN Corporation's franchise, stating that the petition was moot and academic as the franchise already expired, therefore the Court would not be changing anything by voiding the franchise ab initio. However, the quo warranto petition filed against ABS-CBN Convergence Inc. for allegedly illegally operating KBO remains pending.

ABS-CBN subscription multiplex on DTT

References

Defunct television networks in the Philippines
ABS-CBN Corporation channels
Television channels and stations established in 2016
Television channels and stations disestablished in 2020
Movie channels in the Philippines
Assets owned by ABS-CBN Corporation
2016 establishments in the Philippines
2020 disestablishments in the Philippines
TVplus Xtra channel